"The Runaway" is an 1887 short story by Anton Chekhov.

Background and publication history
The story was based on real life incidents Chekhov witnessed when working at the Chikino regional hospital as a young doctor, according to Mikhail Chekhov, which was later corroborated by his sister Maria It was first published on 28 September 1887 by Peterburgskaya Gazeta (issue No. 266), in the Fleeting Notes (Летучие заметки) section, signed A. Chekhonte (А. Чехонте). In a slightly revised version it was reproduced in the illustrated almanac Stoglav in 1889, in Saint Petersburg. It was also included in the collection Detvora (Детвора, Children, St Petersburg, 1889). 

Chekhov included it into volume two of his Collected Works published by Adolf Marks in 1899-1901. During its author's lifetime, the story was translated into Danish, Serbo-Croatian, German, French and Czech languages. In 1893 Y. Tveroyanskaya informed Chekhov, writing from Paris, that her translations of "Gusev" and "The Runaway" were published by Revue des deux Mondes to much public and critical acclaim.

Plot summary
Pashka (full name Pavel Galaktionov), a peasant boy of seven, who has seen, apparently, little of the world, is taken to a local hospital by his mother, with a sore elbow. The doctor initially seems to him a grim and dangerous man, whose wont is to chide people around him, including his own mother, who'd been neglecting her son's trouble for half a year, until the infection has spread into an elbow joint, so that the arm now was in danger of amputation. The doctor decides that Pashka needs an operation, and suggests that he stays hospital. 

The boy finds the hospital a rich ground for investigation, full of surprises. First he is served a gorgeous dinner, the likes of which he'd never seen in his life. Then he ventures into his surroundings and discovers a host of very strange people in the neighboring wards, each of whom is apparently ill, but in their own, peculiar way. One man, Mikhaylo, lies with a bag of ice on his head, without moving. Overwhelmed by his impressions, Pashka dozes off.

The boy is awaken by a noise and leaves his bed. He sees three figures in the corridor trying to drag somebody through next ward's door, and recognizes the dead body as that of Mikhaylo. Horrified, he rushes out of the hospital in panic. He runs around in the dark, finally falls unconscious at the porch… When he comes to, it is broad daylight. He is inside, and the doctor's voice reproaches him for his silliness.

Reception
"The Runaway" was one of Lev Tolstoy's favourite stories. "Father greatly enjoyed a little story by Chekhov in the Stoglav almanac and he read it aloud more than once," Tatyana Tolstaya informed her brother Sergey in the 6 February 1889 letter. Later Tolstoy recited it for his guests and family at least twice, in September 1907 and October 1909. "It is such a pleasure to read it. Occasionally, when it is poignant or funny, I get excited," he told his friend, the Slovak doctor Dushan Makovitsky. Tolstoy included the story (along with "The Darling") into his compilation "The Select Reading".

References

External links 
The Runaway, Robert E.C. Long (1908) and Constance Garnett translations
 Беглец, the original Russian text
 Из жизни земского врача (Memoirs of the Zemstvo Doctor), the 1984 LenTV film based on four Chekhov 'doctor stories': "A Doctor's Visit", "Enemies", "An Awkward Business" and "The Runaway" (YouTube, 43:19)

Short stories by Anton Chekhov
1887 short stories
Works originally published in Russian newspapers